The National Sports Center (NSC) is a multi-sport complex located in Blaine, Minnesota. Its  site includes a soccer stadium, over 50 full-sized soccer fields, a golf course, a meeting and convention facility, and an eight-sheet ice rink, the Super Rink. The National Sports Center has hosted numerous National and World Championship events in soccer, hockey, figure skating, short track speedskating, broomball, rugby, ultimate frisbee and lacrosse. The National Sports Center opened in 1990 after 1987 legislature created the Minnesota Amateur Sports Commission (MASC) and appropriated $14.7 million for the construction of the NSC. The facility has over 3.8 million visitors annually, making it the most-visited sports facility in the state of Minnesota.

The Herb Brooks Foundation, the foundation created by the hockey coach's family, has partnered with the National Sports Center to develop the Herb Brooks Training Center, a dryland and ice hockey training facility that is part of the Super Rink.  Currently the space is leased to partner organization who trains youth both on and off the ice surface.

Each July, the National Sports Center plays host to USA CUP, the largest soccer tournament in the Western Hemisphere with over 1,100 teams and participants from 19 countries.

Mission and governance
The mission of the National Sports Center is two-fold: 1) to create out-of-state economic impact for Minnesota through amateur sports events, and 2) to create sports and fitness opportunities for Minnesota residents. 
The NSC is operated by the National Sports Center Foundation, a 501(c)(3) non-profit corporation. Even though the facility is a State of Minnesota facility, and operations are overseen by the MASC, the NSC receives no operating subsidy from the state, and it is a self-supporting operation.

History

The state legislature approved $14.7 million in funding for the sports complex in 1987. Following the successful U.S. bid for the 1994 FIFA World Cup, civic boosters in the Twin Cities proposed staging matches at the Blaine sports complex with a temporary arrangement to seat 45,000 spectators, but were not named in the final list of venues.

NSC Stadium
The NSC Stadium has a large grandstand along the west sideline of the field and smaller grandstands on the opposite sideline and on either end. The United States women's national soccer team has played four home matches at the NSC, including international matches against Canada, Australia, Norway and Sweden. Mia Hamm scored her 150th international goal at the NSC in a 3–0 victory over Australia in 2004. The NSC has also hosted men's U.S. national team U-17 and U-20 matches. The largest crowd in NSC history was for a 2001 women's soccer match between the United States and Canada, when 15,615 fans watched a 1–0 U.S. victory. The playing field is 118x75 yards.

The NSC played host to the now-defunct Minnesota Thunder of the USL First Division. The stadium served as the Thunder's home from 1990 to 2003 and from May 24, 2008, until the end of the 2009 season when the team folded.

For the 2010 season the NSC Minnesota Stars (now Minnesota United FC) were founded to replace the Minnesota Thunder in the North American Soccer League, and the Stars played their home games at the stadium. The Stars were the champions of the inaugural season of the re-instituted North American Soccer League. Minnesota United FC used the stadium as their home ground until they moved to TCF Bank Stadium after joining Major League Soccer in 2017.

The NSC has hosted KTIS-FM's Joyful Noise Family Fest every year of its existence.

References

External links
 Stadium pictures at StadiumDB.com

Sports in Blaine, Minnesota
n
Soccer venues in Minnesota
Sports venues in Minneapolis–Saint Paul
Minnesota Thunder
Buildings and structures in Anoka County, Minnesota
Tourist attractions in Anoka County, Minnesota
North American Soccer League stadiums
1990 establishments in Minnesota
Defunct National Premier Soccer League stadiums
Sports venues completed in 1990
Ultimate (sport) venues
Sports complexes in the United States